Mineral City may refer to the following places in the United States:
 Mineral City, Arizona, a ghost town.
 Mineral City, Florida
 Mineral City, Indiana
 Mineral City, Missouri
 Mineral City, Nevada
 Mineral City, Ohio
 Mineral City, West Virginia